The Three Romances for Violin and Piano, Op. 22 of Clara Schumann, were written in 1853 and first published in 1855.

Background
Having moved to Düsseldorf in 1853, Clara Schumann, who said that "Women are not born to compose," produced several works, including these three romances. Dedicated to the legendary violinist Joseph Joachim, Schumann and Joachim went on tour with them, even playing them before King George V of Hanover, who was "completely ecstatic" upon hearing them. A critic for the Neue Berliner Musikzeitung praised them, declaring: "All three pieces display an individual character conceived in a truly sincere manner and written in a delicate and fragrant hand." Stephen Pettitt for The Times, wrote, "Lush and poignant, they make one regret that Clara's career as a composer became subordinate to her husband's."

Structure
The romances, scored for violin and piano, are written in three movements:
Andante molto
Allegretto
Leidenschaftlich schnell
The first romance begins with hints of gypsy pathos, before a brief central theme with energetic arpeggios ensues. This is followed by a final section similar to the first, in which Clara Schumann charmingly refers to the main theme from her husband Robert Schumann's first violin sonata. The second romance is more wistful, with many embellishments. It is sometimes considered as representative of all three, beginning with a plaintive appetizer to its energetic, extroverted leaps and arpeggios, followed by a more developed section with the first theme present. The last movement, while very similar to the first but approximately the same length in time as the first two, features long-limbed melodies with rippling, bubbling piano accompaniment.

An average performance is about ten minutes in duration.

References

External links
 

Compositions by Clara Schumann
Romance (music)
Compositions for violin and piano